was a Japanese film and theatre actor.

Profile
Masakazu Tamura was born 1 August 1943 in Kyoto, Japan to Japanese actor Tsumasaburō Bandō. Tsumasaburō Bandō died when Tamura was only nine years old. His brothers Takahiro and Ryō are also actors. He had been thinking of becoming an actor in the future since he was a child. He was thus trained in fighting with swords and more traditional forms of Japanese theatre like Kabuki and Nihon Buyō. He graduated from Seijo University.

In 1960, he made a cameo appearance in the film Hatamoto Gurentai, in which his older brother Takahiro starred. The following year, he signed a contract with the Shōchiku Ōfuna company while he was still in university. In the same year, he made his official film debut in the film Eternal Woman directed by Keisuke Kinoshita. His first leading film role was  Kono koenaki sakebi directed by Hirokazu Ichimura in 1965. He left Shōchiku in 1966 and established his own agency. In 1967, He released the first and last song in his career "Sora Ippai no Namida". His breakthrough came in 1970 after landing a role in the television series Fuyu no Tabi on TBS. From 1970s, Tamura focused predominately on television with occasional film appearances including Yasuharu Hasebe's film Female Prisoner Scorpion: 701's Grudge Song  and Yasuo Furuhata's film Nihon no Fixer . From the mid-1960s to the 1970s, Tamura was called the Japanese Alain Delon.

He appeared in many period dramas (jidaigeki) such as Naruto Hichō on NHK and most of his roles were skilled swordsmen.
He played the role of "Nemuri Kyoshirō" and won great popularity in 1972; it is Tamura's most famous role in jidaigeki. Later, five special version of the drama were made. He played the same role on the stage in 1973 and 1981. From 1963 to 1967,Tamura appeared in the Taiga drama 5 years in a row. He also appeared in the Taiga drama in Haru no Sakamichi (1971) and Shin Heike Monogatari (1972).

From the late 1980s he began to appear in comedy dramas such as Papa wa Newscaster or home dramas and gained new popularity.

In 1993, Tamura played the role of "Ogami Ittō" in Akira Inoue's film Lone Wolf and Cub: Final Conflict by Kazuo Koike's strong request. His photo book of the film was also released.

He is most famous for his role as the polite and highly idiosyncratic police detective "Furuhata Ninzaburō" in a self-titled drama by Japanese playwright Kōki Mitani. This drama was one of the most popular in its time and one of the most popular dramas in the history of Japanese television. The drama started in 1994 and Tamura continued playing Detective Furuhata until 2006.( In 1997, Tamura and Mitani worked together again in Sōrito Yobanaide on Fuji TV.)

In 2007, Tamura appeared in the film for the first in 14 years in Last Love.

Tamura won "Outstanding Actor" at the Monte-Carlo Television Festival for his work in the TV special Ah, You're Really Gone Now in 2009. Tamura appeared in several television dramas related to Chushingura and finally he played the role of "Ōishi Kuranosuke" for the first time in the special drama Chushingura Sono Otoko Ōishi Kuranosuke in 2010.

In 2018, he played the role of "Nemuri Kyoshirō" for the first time in about 20 years in Nemuri Kyoshirō The Final on Fuji TV. But he hinted at his retirement from acting soon after appearing in that TV movie.

He died of heart failure on 3 April 2021 at the age of 77.

Selected filmography

Films

Television dramas

Awards

References

External links

NHK Archives Actor /Masakazu Tamura人物録 田村正和 俳優
Masakazu Tamura, Agency for Cultural Affairs 

1943 births
2021 deaths
Male actors from Kyoto
Seijo University alumni